Ammar Siamwalla is one of Thailand's most prominent economists.

Education 

Siamwalla attended St. Paul's School, Darjeeling in India, and went on to receive a B.Sc. in economics from the London School of Economics and a PhD in economics from Harvard University. His teachers at Harvard included Alexander Gerschenkron, Wassily Leontief and Edward Chamberlin.

Career 

He began his career as an assistant professor and research staff economist at the Department of Economics, Yale University before moving to the Faculty of Economics of Thammasat University as a Rockefeller scholar at the advice of Puey Ungpakorn who was then dean of faculty. Like Puey and other scholars, Siamwalla left Thammasat after the 1976 student massacre.

He was a visiting professor at the Food Research Institute of Stanford University as well as a research fellow with the International Food Policy Research Institute in Washington, D.C.

He has been active at the Thailand Development Research Institute (TDRI) as a program director for agriculture and rural development, and as president of TDRI in 1990-1995.

Siamwalla is an expert in Thai rice, Thai agricultural economics, and development economics. As one of the first Thai trained in neoclassical economics, he has contributed considerably in the development of the modern economic discipline in Thailand.

Currently, he holds a post as a distinguished scholar of Thailand Development Research Institute. He is still active in the economic debates and periodically gives commentaries to the public.

References

External links 
CV on the Thailand Development Research Institute website
Who's Who Thailand page for Ammar Siamwalla

Ammar Siamwalla
Alumni of the London School of Economics
Harvard University alumni
Living people
St. Paul's School, Darjeeling alumni
Ammar Siamwalla
Ammar Siamwalla
1939 births
Ammar Siamwalla
Ammar Siamwalla
Ammar Siamwalla